IFK Mora FK  is a Swedish football club located in Mora.

Background
IFK Mora FK currently plays in Division 2 Dalarna which is the fourth tier of Swedish football. They play their home matches at the Prästholmens IP in Mora.

The club is affiliated to Dalarnas Fotbollförbund. IFK Mora have competed in the Svenska Cupen on 23 occasions and have played 61 matches in the competition.

Season to season

Footnotes

External links
 IFK Mora FK – Official website
 IFK Mora FK on Facebook

Sport in Dalarna County
Football clubs in Dalarna County
Association football clubs established in 1909
1909 establishments in Sweden
IFK Mora